Keeper of Darkness is a 2015 Hong Kong supernatural horror film directed by and starring Nick Cheung. The film co-stars Amber Kuo, Louis Cheung, Sisley Choi, Xing Yu and Philip Keung, with a special appearance by Karena Lam. It was released on 26 November 2015.

Plot
Street-smart exorcist Fatt has a unique method of dealing with vengeful spirits: He negotiates with them and persuades them to let go of their grudges. After recordings of his exorcisms go viral, Fatt attracts the attentions of a murderous spirit who’s targeting mediums, as well as a troublesome reporter who takes great interest in Fatt and his close relationship with a female spirit.

Cast
Nick Cheung
Amber Kuo
Louis Cheung
Sisley Choi
Xing Yu
Philip Keung

Special appearance
Karena Lam

Cameo appearance
Olivia Yan
Lawrence Ng
Angie Cheong
Andrew Lau
Susan Tse
Emotion Cheung
Elena Kong
Ben Wong
Chin Ka-lok
Shawn Yue
Deep Ng
Jacky Cheung

Reception
The following weekend it grossed  and stayed at number-one. On the third weekend it grossed  and was number-two behind Point Break.

Awards and nominations

See also 
List of ghost films
List of Hong Kong films

References

External links

 

2015 films
2015 horror films
Hong Kong horror films
Hong Kong ghost films
2010s Cantonese-language films
Films about exorcism
Films set in Hong Kong
Films shot in Hong Kong
Films directed by Nick Cheung
Hong Kong supernatural horror films
2010s Mandarin-language films
2010s Hong Kong films